The Harvest is a Big Finish Productions audio drama based on the long-running British science fiction television series Doctor Who.  It introduces new companion Hex. It was retroactively made the final part of a trilogy with The Reaping and The Gathering, with all three sporting similar designs for their covers.

Plot
2021. Thomas Hector Schofield (or "Hex" as he prefers to be called) is a nurse at St Gart's Hospital, where things are getting a little strange. The new hire, an attractive girl who insists on being called "McShane", is asking too many questions, and unexplained deaths are happening. What exactly is the mysterious C-Programme… and why does McShane seem to be living in a police box in Totter's Lane?

Cast
The Doctor — Sylvester McCoy
Ace — Sophie Aldred
Hex — Philip Olivier
Subject One — William Boyde
Doctor Stephen Farrer — Richard Derrington
XSO David Garnier — David Warwick
Doctor Mark Mathias — Paul Lacoux
System — Janie Booth
Polk — Mark Donovan

Continuity
The discovery that The Doctor makes about Hex while reading through the hospital files is revealed in Thicker than Water.
 The technology that is spirited away at the end of the linked story The Gathering subsequently appears in this (chronologically earlier story). This includes System being voiced by the same actress.
Hex finally returns to St Gart's a few years later in Project: Destiny.

External links
Big Finish Productions – The Harvest

2004 audio plays
Cybermen audio plays
Seventh Doctor audio plays
Works by Dan Abnett
Fiction set in 2021